Krishna Carp (Hypselobarbus dobsoni) is a species of ray-finned fish in the genus Hypselobarbus. They are found in parts of India.

References

Footnotes

Hypselobarbus
Fish described in 1876